Patrick Shaw (born 19 February 1986) is an Australian former racing cyclist.

Career
Shaw's first victory was stage race Tour of the Southern Grampians in 2007. At the end of the 2009 season, he considered retiring due to failing to get a contract with a European team, but decided to continue riding. 2010 was a successful season for Shaw, as he won stage races Tour of Toowoomba and Tour of Gippsland, along with a stage victory and second place in the Tour of Geelong and one day race Launceston to New Norfolk Classic. These victories gave him first in the Scody Cup National Road Series.

The following year was Shaw's first year as a professional with UCI Continental team . During this season, he booked the overall win of the Tour of Toowoomba, along with the second stage. Shaw left the team for the 2013 season, when he rode for amateur team Satalyst Giant Racing. Shaw announced that he would retire at the end of the 2013 season, but decided to return to Genesys Wealth Advisers the following season and hold off his retirement. Shaw made his UCI World Tour debut in the 2016 Tour Down Under when he was selected for the UniSA-Australia team. He retired at the end of 2016.

Major results

2007
 1st Overall Tour of the Southern Grampians
1st Stage 1
2010
 1st Scody Cup National Road Series
 1st Overall Tour of Toowoomba
 1st Overall Tour of Gippsland
 1st Stage 2 Tour of Geelong
 1st Launceston to New Norfolk Classic
2011
 1st Overall Tour of Toowoomba
1st Stage 2
2012
 6th Overall Tour de Kumano
2013
 1st Melbourne to Ballarat Classic
 6th Overall New Zealand Cycle Classic
2014
 6th Overall New Zealand Cycle Classic
2015
 1st Stage 1 Tour of the Great South Coast
2016
 1st Stage 3 Mitchelton Bay Classic
 9th Overall Tour de Korea
 9th Oceanian Road Race Championships

References

1986 births
Living people
Australian male cyclists